This page provides supplementary chemical data on isobutane.

Material Safety Data Sheet  

The handling of this chemical may incur notable safety precautions. It is highly recommend that you seek the Material Safety Datasheet (MSDS) for this chemical from a reliable source  such as SIRI, and follow its directions.

Structure and properties

Thermodynamic properties

Vapor pressure of liquid 

Table data obtained from CRC Handbook of Chemistry and Physics 44th ed.

Spectral data

References

Chemical data pages
Alkanes
Butane
Chemical data pages cleanup